The American Music Award for Favorite Album – Soul/R&B has been awarded since 1974. Years reflect the year in which the awards were presented, for works released in the previous year (until 2003 onward when awards were handed out on November of the same year). The all-time winner in this category is Michael Jackson with 4 wins. Beyoncé has the most nominations with 7. While the start and end dates for the usage of the category Favorite Black Album are unclear, in 1985 the name was used for the award Prince was given for his album Purple Rain.

Winners and nominees

1970s

1980s

1990s

2000s

2010s

2020s

Category facts

Multiple wins

 4 wins
 Michael Jackson

 3 wins
 Toni Braxton
 Rihanna

 2 wins
 Beyoncé
 Mary J. Blige
 Whitney Houston
 Justin Timberlake
 Usher
 Luther Vandross
 Stevie Wonder
 The Weeknd

Multiple nominations

 7 nominations
 Beyoncé

 6 nominations
 Mariah Carey
 Michael Jackson

 5 nominations
 Whitney Houston
 Stevie Wonder

 4 nominations
 Mary J. Blige
 Chris Brown
 Earth, Wind & Fire
 Janet Jackson
 Alicia Keys
 Rihanna
 The Weeknd
 Luther Vandross

 3 nominations
 Toni Braxton
 Gladys Knight & the Pips
 R. Kelly
 Teddy Pendergrass
 Prince
 Usher

 2 nominations
 Ashanti
 Anita Baker
 Boyz II Men
 Commodores
 Destiny's Child
 Doja Cat
 Khalid
 Marvin Gaye
 Rick James
 Quincy Jones
 Bruno Mars
 MC Hammer
 Lionel Richie
 Keith Sweat
 Justin Timberlake
 TLC
 Summer Walker

References

American Music Awards
Rhythm and blues
Awards established in 1974
1974 establishments in the United States
Album awards